In a standard superconductor, described by a complex field fermionic condensate wave function (denoted ), vortices carry quantized magnetic fields because the condensate wave function  is invariant to increments of the phase  by . There a winding of the phase  by  creates a vortex which carries one flux quantum. See quantum vortex.

The term Fractional vortex is used for two kinds of very different quantum vortices which occur when:

Quantum mechanics prohibits it in a uniform ordinary superconductor, but it becomes possible in an inhomogeneous system, for example, if a vortex is placed on a boundary between two superconductors which are connected only by an extremely weak link (also called a Josephson junction); such a situation also occurs in some cases in polycrystalline samples on grain boundaries etc. At such superconducting boundaries the phase can have a discontinuous jump. Correspondingly, a vortex placed onto such a boundary acquires a fractional phase winding hence the term fractional vortex. A similar situation occurs in Spin-1 Bose condensate, where a vortex with  phase winding can exist if it is combined with a domain of overturned spins.

(ii) A different situation occurs in uniform multicomponent superconductors which allow stable vortex solutions with integer phase winding  , where , which however carry arbitrarily fractionally quantized magnetic flux.

(i) Vortices with non-integer phase winding

Josephson vortices

Fractional vortices at phase discontinuities 

Josephson phase discontinuities may appear in specially designed long Josephson junctions (LJJ). For example, so-called 0-π LJJ have a  discontinuity of the Josephson phase at the point where 0 and  parts join. Physically, such  LJJ can be fabricated using tailored ferromagnetic barrier or using d-wave superconductors. The Josephson phase discontinuities can also be introduced using artificial tricks, e.g., a pair of tiny current injectors attached to one of the superconducting electrodes of the LJJ. The value of the phase discontinuity is denoted by κ and, without losing generality, it is assumed that , because the phase is  periodic.

An LJJ reacts to the phase discontinuity by bending the Josephson phase  in the  vicinity of the discontinuity point, so that far away there are no traces of this perturbation. The bending of the Josephson phase inevitably results in appearance of a local magnetic field  localized around the discontinuity ( boundary). It also results in the appearance of a supercurrent  circulating around the discontinuity. The total magnetic flux Φ, carried by the localized magnetic field is proportional to the value of the discontinuity , namely ,
where  is a magnetic flux quantum. For a π-discontinuity, the vortex of the supercurrent is called a semifluxon. When , one speaks about arbitrary fractional Josephson vortices. This type of vortex is pinned at the phase discontinuity point, but may have two polarities, positive and negative, distinguished by the direction of the fractional flux and direction of the supercurrent (clockwise or counterclockwise) circulating around its center (discontinuity point).

The semifluxon is a particular case of such a fractional vortex pinned at the phase discontinuity point.

Although, such fractional Josephson vortices are pinned, if perturbed they may perform a small oscillations around the phase discontinuity point with an eigenfrequency, that depends on the value of κ.

Splintered vortices (double sine-Gordon solitons)
In the context of d-wave superconductivity, a fractional vortex (also known as splintered vortex) is a vortex of supercurrent carrying unquantized magnetic flux , which depends on parameters of the system. Physically, such vortices may appear at the grain boundary between two d-wave superconductors, which often looks like a regular or irregular sequence of 0 and π facets. One can also construct an artificial array of short 0 and π facets to achieve the same effect. These splintered vortices are solitons. They are able to move and preserve their shape similar to conventional integer Josephson vortices (fluxons). This is opposite to the fractional vortices pinned at phase discontinuity, e.g. semifluxons, which are pinned at the discontinuity and cannot move far from it.

Theoretically, one can describe a grain boundary between d-wave superconductors (or an array of tiny 0 and π facets) by an effective equation for a large-scale phase ψ. Large scale means that the scale is much larger than the facet size. This equation is double sin-Gordon equation, which in normalized units reads 
 

where  is a dimensionless constant resulting from averaging over tiny facets. The detailed mathematical procedure of averaging is similar to the one done for a parametrically driven pendulum, and can be extended to time-dependent phenomena. In essence, described extended φ Josephson junction.

For  has two stable equilibrium values (in each 2π interval): , where . They corresponding to two energy minima. The first vortex has a topological change of 2φ and carries the magnetic flux .

Splintered vortices were first observed at the asymmetric 45° grain boundaries between two d-wave superconductors YBa2Cu3O7−δ.

Spin-triplet Superfluidity
This is in contrast to the  invariance of condensate wavefunction in a spin-0 superfluid.

(ii) Vortices with integer phase winding and fractional flux in multicomponent superconductivity

Different kinds of "Fractional vortices" appear in a different context in multi-component superconductivity where several independent charged condensates or superconducting components interact with each other electromagnetically. 
Such a situation occurs for example in the   theories of the projected quantum states of liquid metallic hydrogen, where two order parameters originate from theoretically anticipated coexistence of electronic and protonic Cooper pairs. Also these fractional vortices carry a superfluid momentum which does not obey  Onsager-Feynman quantization 

Despite the integer phase winding, the basic properties of these kinds of fractional vortices are very different from the Abrikosov vortex solutions. For example, in contrast to the Abrikosov vortex, their magnetic field generically is not exponentially localized in space. Also in some cases the magnetic flux  inverts its direction at a certain distance from the vortex center

See also
Josephson junction
π Josephson junction
magnetic flux quantum
Semifluxon
Quantum vortex

References

Josephson effect
Superfluidity